Datia is the district headquarter of the Datia District in north central Madhya Pradesh,a state of Central India. It is an ancient town, mentioned in the Mahabharata ruled by King Dantavakra. The city is 78 km from Gwalior, 325 km south of New Delhi and 344 km north of Bhopal. About 18 km from Datia is Sonagiri, a sacred Jain hill. Datia is also about 31 km from Jhansi and 52 km from Orchha. The nearest airport is at Gwalior. It was formerly the seat of the eponymous princely state in the British Raj. Datia is situated near Gwalior and on the border with Uttar Pradesh.

The old town is surrounded by a stone wall, encompassing beautiful palaces and gardens. The 17th-century palace of Vir Singh Deo is a notable example of the Hindu architecture of North India. The town serves as a trading center for grains and cotton products. Handloom weaving is an important industry. Datia has several important landmarks and is famous for the seven-story up and seven-story down palace built by Raja Vir Singh Deo in 1614. The town is also a thriving pilgrimage spot for religious devotees. There are many temples, including the Sidhapeeth of Pitambara Devi, Buglamukhi Devi Temple, and Gupteshwar Temple. Pitambara Peeth is a famous Shaktipitha located at the entrance of Datia. This pilgrimage spot is located about 1 km from Datia Bus Station and 3 km from Datia Railway Station on the Delhi-Chennai main line and features Buglamukhi Devi Temple. The Dhumavati Main Temple, established by Golokwasi Swamiji Maharaj and the Vankhandeshwar temple, a Mahabharat period temple of Shiva are the main attraction of the place. It was ruled by Bundela Rajputs until 1947.

History

The state was founded in 1626 by Bundela Rajputs. Rao Bhagwan Rao, 1st Rao of Datia and Baroni 1626/1656, received Datia and Baroni from his father, Raja Bir Singh Deo of Orchha in 1626, and established his own state. After he died in 1676, the state came under British control with other territories in Bundelkhand under the Treaty of Bassein in 1802. The ancient title of the ruling family was Maharaja Rao Raja, but in 1865 the British Government recognized only the title of Maharaja as hereditary. For the British, the Peshwa maintained a military force consisting of 945 cavalry, 5203 infantry, and 3 guns.

The motto of the royal family was Wir dalap Sharandah ("Lord of the Brave Army, Giver of Refuge"). In 1896–97, the state suffered from famine, and again to a lesser extent in 1899–1900. After India's independence in 1947, the Maharaja of Datia acceded the dominion of India, which later merged with the Union of India. Datia, together with the rest of the Bundelkhand agency, became part of the new state of Vindhya Pradesh in 1950. In 1956, the Vindhya Pradesh state was merged with certain other areas to form the state of Madhya Pradesh within the Union of India.

Geography
It has an average elevation of 302 metres (990 feet).

Climate

Demographics

As of the 2011 India census, Datia had a population of 100,466. Males constitute 53% of the population and females 47%. Datia has an average literacy rate of 68%, higher than the national average of 59.5%: male literacy is 75% and female literacy is 60%. In Datia, 15% of the population is under six years of age.

Sites of interest

Datia is best known for  the Pitambara Peeth, a famous shaktipitha located at the entrance of Datia. This pilgrimage spot features Bagalamukhi Devi Temple and Dhumavati Mai Temple, established by Shri Golokwasi Swamiji Maharaj. Vankhandeshwar, a Mahabharat period temple of God Shiva, is also situated here. A temple of the goddess Peetaambara Bagalamukhi, Shri Siddheshwar mahadev temple in village Kurthara located 20 km from Datia and white marble Jain temples are located at Sonagiri. Sonagiri is located 9 miles from Datia and is well connected by road and train.

References

External links

RASS-JB Public School Datia
'Shri Rawatpura Sarkar Shanti International Public School, Datia
Government website on Datia district
Genealogy of the ruling chiefs of Datia

 
Cities and towns in Datia district
Cities in Bundelkhand
Cities in Madhya Pradesh